This is a list of current monarchies by order of succession (hereditary and elective).

Current monarchies

See also
 List of monarchies

Notes

References

Order of succession
Legal history
Real property law
Succession
Law-related lists